Molchanov Merchants' Shop - is an architectural monument in the historical center of Kamensk-Uralsky, Sverdlovsk oblast.

The building was granted the status of regional significance on the 28th of December 2001 (the Government Decree of Sverdlovsk oblast No. 859). The object number of cultural heritage of regional significance is 661710946790005.

Architecture 
This is a one-story building stretching from north to south. The main northern façade faces Lenin Street. It was constructed at the end of 19th century, and is a good example of architectural brick style.

The front façade has central-axial composition. The corners of the building are set of bossage. The doorway with attics emphasizes the main facade of the building. On each side of the doorway are two windows. Brick architraves are complex formed, framing the windows. The dripstones are similar to baroque decorations. The doorway architraves are decorated with dentals. Underneath the window openings are fielded panels and dentals. The apex of the central part of the building is decorated with a solar sign. The other parts of the monument have simple décor.

References

Literature 
 
 Памятники архитектуры Каменска-Уральского / С. И. Гаврилова, Л. В. Зенкова, А. В. Кузнецова, А. Ю. Лесунова — Екатеринбург: Банк культурной информации, 2008. — 92 с.

Tourist attractions in Sverdlovsk Oblast
Buildings and structures in Kamensk-Uralsky
Cultural heritage monuments in Kamensk-Uralsky
Cultural heritage monuments of regional significance in Sverdlovsk Oblast